Domostroy (Domestic Order) is a 16th-century Russian set of household rules, instructions and advice pertaining to various religious, social, domestic, and family matters of the Russian society. Core Domostroy values tended to reinforce obedience and submission to God, Tsar and Russian Church. Key obligations were fasting, prayer, icon veneration and the giving of alms.  

Its real author is unknown, but the most widespread version was edited by the archpriest Silvester, an influential advisor to young Ivan IV. The text does include an epistle entitled "64. A Father's Epistle Instructing His Son," which was written by Silvester instructing his son, Anthemius, on some of the larger themes found within the Domostroi.  An updated edition of the Domostroy was compiled by Karion Istomin during the late 17th century. To modern researchers, it is a precious account about Muscovite society and the life of wealthy boyars and merchants.

Modern researchers tend to trace the origins of the Domostroy to the 15th century Novgorod Republic, where it could have been used as a kind of moral codex for the wealthy. As such, it has some quotations from the Book of Proverbs and other biblical texts, and from  earlier Muscovite moral texts such as Izmaragd and Zlatoust, and from some western texts such as Book of Christian Teachings (Czech) and Le Ménagier de Paris (French).

In modern Russia, the term Domostroy has a pejorative meaning. It is used in such classic texts as Herzen's My Past and Thoughts and Turgenev's Fathers and Sons to refer to a traditionalist way of life associated with patriarchal tyranny, as exemplified by the following quotations: "A wife which is good, laborious, and silent is a crown to her husband." "Don't pity a youngling while beating him: if you punish him with a rod, he will not die, but become healthier."

Structure 

The book is divided into 67 sections (in Sil'vestr's version) dealing roughly with the following matters:
 Religious practices
 Relationship between Muscovite people and the tsar
 Organization of the family
 Management of the household
 Culinary

See also
 Medieval cuisine
 Patriarchy

References 

 Domostroy, SPb, Science, 1994 (from the presentation of the book)

16th century in Russia
Early Russian literature
16th-century Christian texts
Christianity and law in the 16th century
16th-century books
Works of unknown authorship
Medieval cookbooks